Kazem Khvajeh (also Romanized as Kāz̧em Khvājeh) is a village in Aq Su Rural District, in the Central District of Kalaleh County, Golestan Province, Iran. At the 2006 census, its population was 1,409, in 312 families.

References 

Populated places in Kalaleh County